Werner Kölliker (born 23 January 1935) is a Swiss rower. He competed in the men's eight event at the 1960 Summer Olympics.

References

External links
 

1935 births
Living people
Swiss male rowers
Olympic rowers of Switzerland
Rowers at the 1960 Summer Olympics
Sportspeople from the canton of Solothurn